"My Love" is the first single by British DJ and record producer Route 94, featuring vocals by Jess Glynne. It was released in the United Kingdom on 28 February 2014, through Rinse Recordings. The song topped the UK Singles Chart, peaked at number 12 on the Irish Singles Chart and also charted in Belgium. The song was written by Glynne and Route 94, and produced by Route 94.

Glynne's previous single, "Rather Be" with Clean Bandit, topped the UK chart the previous month. The song and an acoustic version appear on the deluxe edition of her album I Cry When I Laugh. The Route 94 version has since become a 2× Platinum record in the UK and the acoustic version has separately received a silver certification.

The song was sampled by rapper Lil Keed on "Proud of Me", featuring Young Thug, released in 2019.

Composition
"My Love" is a deep house song heavily influenced by 1990s Eurodance.

Critical reception
Robert Copsey of Digital Spy gave the song a positive review, stating:
"The latest producer-turned-frontman poised to take over the charts seemingly out of nowhere is Route 94; a Rinse FM-signed wonderkid who has shot through the ranks after receiving praise from Radio 1's Annie Mac as well as D'n'B DJs Skream and Benga. What's more, his mysterious alias actually holds meaning: it's the US highway that links Chicago – the home of house music – and Detroit, the birthplace of techno. Naturally, what will almost certainly be his breakthrough hit 'My Love' lands somewhere in the middle on the deep house pH spectrum, its heady piano thuds and gauzy electro glow offset by the radio friendly vocals of Jess Glynne, who featured on Clean Bandit's recent chart topper 'Rather Be'. And while you'd think the latter's recent success would have satisfied the public's appetite for chart-friendly house, we suspect its reign is far from over yet."

Chart performance
The song debuted at number one for one week on the UK Singles Chart, dethroning Pharrell Williams's single "Happy" and also was number one on the UK Dance Chart, dethroning Clean Bandit's single "Rather Be", which also features Glynne, from that position with first-week sales of 120,770. It was also successful in mainland Europe, peaking within the top ten in five other countries, peaking at number two on the Euro Digital Songs chart, behind Pharrell Williams, for one week.

Music video
A music video directed by Ryan Staake to accompany the release of "My Love" was first released onto YouTube on 27 January 2014 at a total length of three minutes and eleven seconds and was filmed in infrared. It follows a young man (Jon Fleming) as he enters a club, dances with a young woman (Lorena Sarria), leaves with her, they embrace in the rain and later at her house it is implied that they have sex. She then showers and he leaves. Just before the video ends, it turns back to normal colour and the young man is shown walking out in the rain. The video was taken down after more than 363,000,000 views. As of January 2022, the video is now back online.

Track listing

Charts and certifications

Weekly charts

Year-end charts

Certifications

Release history

References

2014 songs
2014 debut singles
Route 94 (musician) songs
Jess Glynne songs
Number-one singles in Scotland
UK Singles Chart number-one singles
Songs written by Jess Glynne
Deep house songs